Zarman (also Romanized as Zarmān and Zarmun) is a village in Doboluk Rural District, Arjomand District, Firuzkuh County, Tehran Province, Iran. At the 2006 census, its population was 200, in 51 families.

References 

Populated places in Firuzkuh County